Tweed is a municipality located in central-eastern Ontario, Canada, in Hastings County.

History
The Municipality of Tweed is an amalgamated municipality comprising the former Village of Tweed and the former Hungerford Township and former Elzevir & Grimsthorpe Townships. The Municipality was incorporated on 1 January 1998 as a lower tier municipality within the County of Hastings two tier governing system.

The post office was established in 1852.

Elzevir Township (formed circa 1869, location of a major gold strike) and Grimsthorpe Township (formed 22 February 1867 during the local gold rush) had been administered as one entity since before 1968 until amalgamation into the Municipality of Tweed.

As of 2004, the total land area was approximately 230,000 acres (930 km2), 30% of which was Crown land. Lakes, rivers and streams account for approximately 4,650 acres (18 km2). The total 2004 property assessment for the Municipality of Tweed was $309,000,000. Its composition was 84% residential, 7% farm, 6% commercial and industrial, and 3% other categories.

A primary attraction in the Municipality of Tweed is a vacation destination located at 115 Varty Road, with cottages and campsites along the Skootamatta River, a part of the Moira River system. From 2000, it was managed as Tipper's Family Campground, run by the family of Canadian violist, Jayden Tipper. Purchased by the Haid family in 2018, it is managed as Haid's Hideaway Family Campground.

Immediately east of the Village of Tweed is Stoco Lake, home to a popular and uncommon sport-fish, the muskellunge or Muskie (Esox masquinongy). Stoco Lake is a part of the Moira River system; the Black River joins the Moira River near the Village of Tweed.

The Napanee, Tamworth and Quebec Railway (later the Bay of Quinte Railway) had a spur from Tamworth, Ontario to Tweed; the Tweed-Yarker and Tweed-Bannockburn segments were abandoned by 1941 and the former Napanee-Smiths Falls mainline abandoned in the late 1970s. From the 1880s, the Canadian Pacific Railway's Havelock Subdivision passed through Tweed to Glen Tay and Smith Falls. The line was abandoned from Glen Tay to Tweed in 1973 then Tweed to Havelock in 1987. A more westerly portion of the line still runs through Peterborough.

Communities
Besides the village proper of Tweed, the Municipality of Tweed comprises a number of villages and hamlets, including the following communities such as Actinolite, Bogart, Buller, Chapman, Cosy Cove, Coulters Hill, Duff Corners, East Hungerford, Elzevir, Farrell Corners, Hungerford, Larkins, Lime Lake, Lodgeroom Corners, Lost Channel, Marlbank, Moneymore, Otter Creek, Queensborough, Stoco, Sulphide, and Thomasburg

Approximately 30% of the population resides in the Village of Tweed, the only urban center.  The remainder of the Municipality of Tweed consists of a large rural area which reaches from Wadsworth Lake in the north to Roslin in the south.  The Municipality of Tweeds has five hamlets: (Actinolite, Marlbank, Queensborough, Stoco, and Thomasburg). The residents of the hamlets and the rural area comprise the other 70% of the population.  In 2004, there were approximately 2870 households.

Demographics 

Populations prior to amalgamation (1998):
 Total Population in 1996:  5,706
 Elzevir and Grimsthorpe township: 854
 Hungerford township: 3,280
 Tweed village: 1,572
 Population in 1991:
 Elzevir and Grimsthorpe township: 781
 Hungerford township: 3,085
 Tweed village: 1,626

Mother tongue:
 English as first language: 95.8%
 French as first language: 0.8%
 English and French as first language: 0.4%
 Other as first language: 3.0%

Forest fire protection history

The Tweed Forest Fire District was founded by the former Ontario Department of Lands and Forests (now the MNR) in 1922 as one of 17 districts to help protect Ontario's forests from fire by early detection from fire towers. The headquarters for the district were housed at Hungerford Road in town. It was the central headquarters for 21 fire lookout towers. When a fire was spotted in the forest a towerman would get the degree bearings from his respective tower and radio back the information to headquarters. When one or more towermen from other towers in the area would also call in their bearings, the forest rangers at headquarters could get a 'triangulation' read and plot the exact location of the fire on their map. This way a team of forest firefighters could be dispatched as soon as possible to get the fire under control. In 1958 the -tall Hungerford firetower was erected beside the station. However, in the 1970s all the towers had been decommissioned as aerial firefighting techniques were employed. The Hungerford tower was disassembled in 1996 and placed behind the Tweed Heritage Centre.

Notable stories

Tweed made national news in 2010 when Colonel Russell Williams, a resident of Ottawa who had a cottage in Tweed, was arrested and accused of the murders of Jessica Lloyd and Corporal Marie-France Comeau. Williams was convicted in 2010 and received two life sentences for the first-degree murders. Williams is in prison in Port-Cartier, Quebec.
 On December 14, 2017, a Hydro One helicopter working on a row of transmission towers crashed northeast of Tweed. All 4 people on board, the pilot and three electrical workers, were killed.
On March 10, 2021, a fire destroyed the landmark Tweedsmuir Hotel. Built in 1886 the hotel had many names and owners but was always a cornerstone of the community.

See also
List of townships in Ontario

References

External links

Lower-tier municipalities in Ontario
Municipalities in Hastings County